Marianne Laqueur (11 June 1918 - 5 April 2006) was a German Jewish refugee to Turkey, a computer scientist and local politician.

Early life 
Marianne Laqueur was born on 11 June 1918 in Berlin, the daughter of August and Ilse Laqueur (née Netto). Her father was a doctor and physiotherapist at the Virchow Hospital in Berlin. When he lost his job under the Nazis in 1936 due to his Jewish ancestry, her parents emigrated to Turkey with Marianne and lived in Ankara. Her older brother Kurt Laqueur followed them to escape persecution after he was denied the right to study or follow an apprenticeship, he later became a German diplomat.

Career 
Laqueur sought work as what she called a "Sprachtippse" (language typist) in a Turkish bank, translating Turkish into English and German. During the Second World War, she worked for the Turkish section of the Jewish Agency in Ankara, among others. She remained in Turkey until 1960. She undertook worldwide assignments for various companies, including IBM and NCR over the next forty years, becoming one of the first female computer scientists. She worked in Beirut, Tel Aviv, North Africa and the USA. It was not until the 1980s that she returned to Germany.

Political career 
From 1993 to 1997 Laqueur was a member of the city council for the Bündnis 90/Die Grünen Green parliamentary group in the Wiesbadener Stadtparlament (the Wiesbaden city parliament). From 1994 to 1997, she served as deputy chair of the parliamentary group.

In the last decade of her life, she was a sought-after contemporary witness who was able to describe her own experience of flight from Nazi Germany and her exile in Turkey.

Marianne Laqueur died on 5 April 2006 in Wiesbaden.

References

Further reading 
 Aktives Museum, Faschismus und Widerstand in Berlin e.V. (Hrsg.): Haymatloz. Exil in der Türkei 1933 – 1945. Katalog zur Dauerausstellung, Berlin 2000.

1918 births
2006 deaths
Emigrants from Nazi Germany
People from Berlin
Jewish German scientists
German politicians
Computer scientists
German computer scientists
Women computer scientists